The Delfonics is the third studio album by American vocal group The Delfonics. It was released via Philly Groove Records in 1970. It peaked at number 61 on the Billboard 200 chart, making it the most successful album of the group's career.

Track listing

Charts

References

External links
 

1970 albums
The Delfonics albums
Albums produced by Thom Bell
Albums arranged by Thom Bell
Philly Groove Records albums